Rhee Brothers may refer to:

 Rhee Bros., Inc., a food importing company in the USA
 Chong Chul Rhee, Chong Hyup Rhee, and Chong Yoon Rhee, masters of Rhee Taekwon-Do in Australia
 Simon Rhee and Phillip Rhee, martial artists and actors in the USA